The Dan Nagle Walnut Grove Pioneer Village is an open-air museum located at the north edge of Scott County Park, four miles northeast of Long Grove in Scott County, Iowa. The village is a re-creation of an 1860s Scott County cross-roads settlement and stage coach stop, is made up of 22 historic buildings, some of which have been relocated from rural Scott County, including an old church, a bank, a train depot and boardwalk of shops, which includes a soda and ice cream shop open in the summer.

Harvest Moon Song and Dance Fest
The Harvest Moon Song and Dance Fest is held annually at the museum.

References

Museums in Scott County, Iowa
Open-air museums in Iowa